Went to Coney Island on a Mission from God... Be Back by Five is a 1998 American film directed by Richard Schenkman and written by Schenkman and Jon Cryer.  It premiered at the Los Angeles Film Festival.

Plot

Daniel (Jon Cryer) and Stan (Rick Stear) search for a childhood friend of theirs – Richie (Rafael Báez), who they believe may be homeless and mentally ill.  The film intercuts with flashbacks from their youth to their 30s. Daniel works at a jewelry store that is basically a pawn shop. Stan, who limps as a result of a childhood medical procedure, is a borderline alcoholic and gambler who fights endlessly with his longtime girlfriend, Gabby (Ione Skye).

Principal cast

Production 
The title has its origin in a note that Cryer left for his girlfriend after going to look for a former classmate who he heard had become homeless and was living in Coney Island.

Reception 
Rotten Tomatoes reports that 43% of seven surveyed critics gave the film a positive review; the average rating is 5.4/10. A.O. Scott of The New York Times gave it a mixed review and wrote,"Went to Coney Island never quite comes to dramatic or comic life." Emanuel Levy of Variety wrote that Cryer, Baez, and Stear "give proficient performances that serve the material well, though they can't elevate it to the poignancy and depth intended by the director". Kevin Thomas of the Los Angeles Times called it a "deeply felt, engaging little film" that will stick with audiences after it ends.

It won the audience award at the Austin Film Festival.

References

External links 
 
 
 

1998 comedy-drama films
1998 films
American comedy-drama films
1990s English-language films
Films directed by Richard Schenkman
Films set in Coney Island
1990s American films